Jake Hansen (born June 19, 1998) is an American football linebacker for the Houston Texans of the National Football League (NFL). He played college football at Illinois.

College career
Hansen was a member of the Illinois Fighting Illini for six seasons. He decided to utilize the extra year of eligibility granted to college athletes who played in the 2020 season due to the coronavirus pandemic and return to Illinois for a sixth season. Hansen suffered a season ending knee injury six games into the year. He finished his collegiate career with 276 tackles, 28.5 tackles for loss, and eight sacks and also forced 12 fumbles with seven fumble recoveries and intercepted three passes.

Professional career
Hansen signed with the Houston Texans as an undrafted free agent on May 13, 2022. He made the Texans' initial 53-man roster out of training camp.

References

External links
Illinois Fighting Illini bio
Houston Texans bio

Living people
Players of American football from Florida
American football linebackers
Illinois Fighting Illini football players
Houston Texans players
1998 births